The 2021–22 Under 20 Elite League is an age-restricted association football tournament for national Under-20 teams. It is the fourth edition of the Under 20 Elite League.

Participating teams

League table

Results

Goalscorers

References

Under 20 Elite League
2021–22 in European football